A list of films produced in Hong Kong in 1990:.

1990

Notes

External links
 IMDB list of Hong Kong films
 Hong Kong films of 1990 at HKcinemamagic.com

1990
Lists of 1990 films by country or language
1990 in Hong Kong